Piazza Brembana is a comune (municipality) in the Province of Bergamo in the Italian region of Lombardy, located about  northeast of Milan and about  north of Bergamo.  

Piazza Brembana borders the following municipalities: Camerata Cornello, Cassiglio, Lenna, Olmo al Brembo, Piazzolo, Valnegra.

People 

 Alessandro Carmelo Ruffinoni, (1943) bishop of Caxias do Sul

References